Johann Matthias (Matyhias) Hase (Haas, Haase) (anglicised as Johannes Hasius) (14 January 1684 – 24 September 1742) was a German mathematician, astronomer, and cartographer.

Biography
Hase taught at Leipzig and his native Augsburg.  In 1720, he became professor of mathematics at the University of Wittenberg.

 A map of Africa,  (1737) which itself was based on the maps developed by Leo Africanus 
  
 Kingdoms of David and Solomon (1739). At Nuremberg, Hase published his .  This work, as a historical survey of the kingdoms of David and Solomon, as well as of the dominions of the Seleucids, included maps of Syria and Egypt .
  (1743). It depicts Europe.
  (1744). It shows Asia.

  (1744), published at Nuremberg. It shows the Kingdom of Hungary, as well as countries along the Danube and in Southeast Europe.

Hase died in Wittenberg. The crater Hase on the moon is named after him.

Allegories
Based on what is known of the sources of the Africa map, Hase's primary contribution to the maps were adding a cultural explanation in the form of allegorical cartoons on the map itself, though he may have had a greater role in other maps. On the map of Africa, for example, he added in the lower corner of the map a large allegorical scene showing a finely dressed woman in clothes that are similar to modern-day clothing. The men are either dressed with single piece servant's clothes, or an African ruler's garb, or fully dressed European traders. Notably, the indigenous African ruler is sitting on the back of a crouching human prostrating as a stool. Also shown in the allegory are lions and other animals and some semblance of life on the continent. 
The Asia map also has such allegorical scene.

References

USC Public Archives  
Maps of Europe  
Die Mathematikprofessoren der Leucorea  
Slowakeiportal 

1684 births
1742 deaths
Scientists from Augsburg
18th-century German astronomers
German cartographers
18th-century German mathematicians
18th-century cartographers